William Theodore Katt (born February 16, 1951) is an American actor and musician best known as the star of the television series The Greatest American Hero. He first became known for playing Tommy Ross, the ill-fated prom date of Carrie White in the original film version of Carrie (1976) and subsequently starred in films such as First Love (1977), Big Wednesday (1978) and Butch and Sundance: The Early Days (1979).  Between 1985 and 1988, he starred in nine Perry Mason television films alongside his mother Barbara Hale, who reprised her role as Della Street from the television series Perry Mason.

Early life
Katt was born in Los Angeles to actors Bill Williams (birth name Herman August Wilhelm Katt) and Barbara Hale. He grew up in the San Fernando Valley and began acting as a teenager, sometimes appearing with his parents.  He graduated from Army & Navy Academy, Carlsbad, California.

Career

Katt attended Orange Coast College before pursuing a career as a musician. Inspired by his father, he then started an acting career, appearing in summer stock theatre and in small television roles. His earliest film credits include the role of a jock, Tommy Ross in Brian De Palma's 1976 horror film adaptation Carrie, which allowed Katt to make a name for himself. In 1978, he appeared as Barlow, a young surfer, in the John Milius drama film Big Wednesday opposite Jan-Michael Vincent and Gary Busey. His mother in that film was his real-life mother, Barbara Hale. The following year he took the role of Sundance Kid in the 1979 film Butch and Sundance: The Early Days. The role in Big Wednesday made him so well known in the surfing community that in 2004 he presented one of the Association of Surfing Professionals awards at their annual World Championship Tour ceremony to wild applause from the crowd of professional surfers. Katt explained in a 1979 interview with critic Roger Ebert that he was holding out only for parts that were personally interesting to him.

In December 1975, Katt auditioned for the part of Luke Skywalker in 1977's science fiction blockbuster Star Wars Episode IV: A New Hope, and footage of his audition has been featured in many Star Wars documentaries. He was seriously considered for the role, which went to Mark Hamill, and Katt instead starred that year in First Love, playing a college student who experiences his first romantic relationship.

In 1981, Katt was cast as the title role in a filmed version of the Broadway musical comedy Pippin, which received mixed reviews. He won his best remembered role that year, however, as Ralph Hinkley, a mild-mannered schoolteacher given a superpowered suit by aliens on the popular television series The Greatest American Hero, a role he played until the show was canceled in 1983. Also starring veteran actor Robert Culp, the show retains a cult fanbase. Its theme song, "Believe It or Not", penned by Mike Post, also became a hit in the music charts. In 1982, due to the success of the first season of The Greatest American Hero, Katt signed to MCA and released a soft rock album, Secret Smiles under the name Billy Katt.

After The Greatest American Hero, Katt starred in Baby: Secret of the Lost Legend (1985), about explorers searching for apatosaurs in Africa, and the cult horror/comedy film House (1986); he later reprised his role for the third sequel, House IV, in 1992.  Between 1985 and 1988, Katt starred in nine Perry Mason television films, playing the role of private detective Paul Drake Jr., son of Paul Drake, a fictional private detective in the Perry Mason television series and the Perry Mason series of detective stories written by Erle Stanley Gardner; Katt co-starred with his mother Barbara Hale, who reprised her role of Della Street from the Perry Mason television series. Katt starred in the 1989 TV series Top of the Hill and made a guest appearance on the first episode of the short-lived 1991 series Good Sports.

Katt continues to appear on television and in supporting film roles, and does voice acting as well. He appeared in an episode of House in 2006. In recent years, he has returned to genre work, with appearances in Andromeda and Justice League and roles in the award-winning film Gamers (2006), The Man from Earth (2007), and Alien vs Hunter (2007).

Katt briefly appeared in Heroes season 3 in "The Butterfly Effect" as a nosy reporter investigating Ali Larter's character. He portrayed Jack Matheson in the thriller film Mirrors 2. In 2010 during season 6, Katt guest starred as C.J. Payne's musician birth-father in the episode "Who's Your Daddy Now?" in the Tyler Perry comedy House of Payne.

Katt also has written a Greatest American Hero comic book and contributed to that series' Facebook page.

In 2013, Katt played himself in the spoof film Paranormal Movie directed by Kevin Farley. In 2014, he appeared in The Unwanted. In 2020, he appeared in The 2nd.

Personal life
Katt married Deborah Kahane in 1979 and they have two sons, Clayton and Emerson. They divorced in 1992.

He married Danielle Hirsch in 1993 and has a daughter with her, Dakota, as well as a stepson, Andrew.

Selected filmography

References

External audio interview. https://www.spreaker.com/user/10945005/cbc-ep-358-william-katt-gah-commentary

External links

Audio interview with William Katt at comic book site comiXology

1951 births
Male actors from Los Angeles
American male film actors
American male voice actors
American male television actors
20th-century American male actors
21st-century American male actors
Living people
Orange Coast College alumni